Jay Ward Productions, Inc. (sometimes shortened to Ward Productions) is an American animation studio based in Costa Mesa, California. It was founded in 1948 by American animator Jay Ward.

The Jay Ward Productions library and rights were previously managed by Bullwinkle Studios, a joint venture between Jay Ward Productions and the DreamWorks Animation subsidiary of NBCUniversal.

History
The company was based on the Sunset Strip in West Hollywood, across Sunset Boulevard from the Chateau Marmont.

Jay Ward Productions today
By 2007, Jay Ward Productions had formed Bullwinkle Studios LLC, a joint venture with Classic Media (then an Entertainment Rights subsidiary), to manage the Jay Ward characters. Bullwinkle Studios's first production was George of the Jungle with Studio B Productions, a unit of DHX Media. The series was broadcast on Teletoon, then added to Cartoon Network. Tiffany Ward served as president of Ward Productions and Bullwinkle Studios. Classic Media was acquired in 2012 by DreamWorks Animation, which was later purchased by the Comcast-owned NBCUniversal in 2016.

On February 3, 2022, Jay Ward Productions signed a deal with WildBrain to produce new content based on its portfolio. The agreement also includes distribution rights to the entire Jay Ward Productions library. However, DreamWorks retains the distribution rights to its co-productions.

Television programs

Animation

Jay Ward Productions
 Crusader Rabbit (1950–1959)
 Rocky and His Friends/The Bullwinkle Show (1959–1964)
 Fractured Fairy Tales
 Aesop and Son
 Bullwinkle's Corner
 Mr. Know-It-All
 The Rocky and Bullwinkle Fan Club
 Peabody's Improbable History
 Dudley Do-Right of the Mounties
 Hoppity Hooper (1964–1967)
 Uncle Waldo's Cartoon Show
 The Dudley Do Right Show (1964–1966)
 George of the Jungle (1967)
 Super Chicken
 Tom Slick
 The Mr. Peabody & Sherman Show (2015–2017)
 The Adventures of Rocky and Bullwinkle (2018–2019)

Bullwinkle Studios
 George of the Jungle (2006–2008, 2015–2017)

Live-action
 Fractured Flickers (1962–1964)

Commercials

General Mills

 Cheerios, using characters Rocky and Bullwinkle (1959–1970), Boris Badenov (1959–1970), Aesop and Son (1960–1970), Dudley Do-Right (1961–1970), and Hoppity Hooper (1961–1972)
 Trix, using characters Rocky and Bullwinkle (1959–1970), and Hoppity Hooper (1961–1972)
 Cocoa Puffs, using characters Rocky and Bullwinkle (1959–1970), and Hoppity Hooper (1961–1972)
 Jets, using characters Rocky and Bullwinkle (1959–1970), and Hoppity Hooper (1961–1972)
 Wheat Hearts, using characters Mr. Peabody and Sherman (1959–1970)
 Frosty O's, using characters Dudley Do-Right (1961–1970), and Hoppity Hooper (1961–1972)
 Lucky Charms, using characters Boris and Natasha (1964–1970), and Hoppity Hooper (1964–1972)

Quaker Oats Company

 Cap'n Crunch (1963–1984)
 Quisp and Quake (1965–1973)
 Monster Munch (1966)
 Aunt Jemima (1968–1973)
 King Vitaman (1968)
 Frosted Oat Flakes (1968–1969)
 Fudge Town Cookies (1968)
 Mr. Chips Cookies (1968–1969)
 Scooter Pie Cookies (1968)
 Cinnamon Bear Cereal (1969)
 Cinnamon Flakes (1969)
 Crackles (1969)
 Gauchos Cookies (1969)
 Mister E (1969)
 Pronto (1969)
 Scooter Pies (1969)
 Vitaman the Great (1969)
 King Vitaman (1970–1971)
 Halfsies (1979–1982)
 Hi-Lo's (1980)

Films

Live-action

 Boris and Natasha (1992) (TV film)
 George of the Jungle (1997)
 Dudley Do-Right (1999)
 The Adventures of Rocky and Bullwinkle (2000) (live-action/animated)
 George of the Jungle 2 (2003) (direct-to-video)

Animation

Jay Ward Productions
Snidley's Monster (1961) (short film)
Sleeping Beauty (1961) (short film)
 The Phox, The Box, and The Lox (1999) (short film)

Bullwinkle Studios
 Mr. Peabody & Sherman (2014)
 Rocky and Bullwinkle (2014) (direct-to-video short film)

References

Further reading
 
 
 

 
American animation studios
Television production companies of the United States
Cinema of Southern California
Entertainment companies based in California
Mass media companies established in 1948
1948 establishments in California
Companies based in Costa Mesa, California
DreamWorks Classics
Universal Pictures subsidiaries
NBCUniversal
General Mills
WildBrain